Woodbridge is a township in Middlesex County, New Jersey. According to the United States Census Bureau, the township had a total land area of  including 23.213 square miles (60.122 km2).  There are many distinct sections, many of which are census-designated places (CDPs). Some have their own ZIP Codes.

Sections and neighborhoods

Woodbridge Township's municipal administration officially recognizes ten geographical sections, reflected in its slogan "Ten small towns, one great community"; these areas are as follows
 Avenel
 Colonia
 Fords
 Hopelawn
 Iselin
 Keasbey
 Menlo Park Terrace
 Port Reading
 Sewaren
 Woodbridge (Woodbridge Proper)

See also
Middlesex Greenway (New Jersey)
List of neighborhoods in Edison, New Jersey
Neighborhoods in Perth Amboy, New Jersey

References

Woodbridge Township, New Jersey
W
Neighborhoods